Jerry Desmonde  (born James Robert Sadler; 20 July 1908 – 11 February 1967) was an English actor and presenter. He is perhaps best known for his work as a comedic foil in duos with Norman Wisdom and Sid Field.

Early life 
Jerry Desmonde was born James Robert Sadler in the Linthorpe area of Middlesbrough on 20 July 1908, the son of music hall performers who toured the halls throughout England and Scotland.

Career
Sadler first appeared on stage at the age of 11 and later became part of his family's act The Four Sadlers. He built a career as a song and dance man in musical theatre and later toured parts of the United States in 1927-1928 with Beatrice Lillie and Noël Coward in the two-act revue This Year of Grace. By 1934, he had married Peggy Duncan and they toured as a double act called Peg and Jerry, largely in Scotland.

In the 1940s, Desmonde was briefly a straight man for Scottish comedian Dave Willis and in 1942 he was invited to be straight man for stage comedian Sid Field becoming one of the most celebrated comedy teams ever to appear on stage. They appeared together on stage in three very successful revues, Strike a New Note (1943), Strike it Again (1944) and Piccadilly Hayride (1946) at the Prince of Wales Theatre, London and in two films, London Town (1946), an infamous flop, and in Cardboard Cavalier (1949).

The two men next worked together on a stage play, Harvey at the Prince of Wales Theatre, from which Desmonde was ultimately sacked. In 1950 a few months later, during the play's run Field died of a heart attack.

In 1949 Desmonde appeared on television as a presenter in Rooftop Rendezvous.
He was a regular panelist and occasional guest host on the original UK version of the television panel game What's My Line? (1951–1962), and appeared in several TV comedies Holiday Camp (1951) with Arthur Askey,
A Flight of Fancy (1952) with Jimmy Young, then a singer working as a comedian, Spectacular (1960)
Before Your Very Eyes (1956–58) with Arthur Askey,

He appeared in Whack-O! (1960) and Bud in 1963 a sitcom with Bud Flanagan and other members of The Crazy Gang.
He also appeared in The Dickie Henderson Show (1963) and episodes of the ITV television series A Question of Happiness (1964), The Plane Makers (1964),
The Villains (1965), No Hiding Place (1965), The Mask of Janus (1965), The Valliant Varneys (1965), Pardon the Expression (1966) and Vendetta (1966).

As a game show host he hosted ATV's Hit The Limit (1956)
and The 64,000 Question (1956) television game shows and in October 1956 Jerry appeared on the front cover of TV Times magazine.

On radio he appeared with Bob Hope on The Bob Hope Show (1951) and (1954)
the CBS radio play The Incredible History of John Shepherd (1954),
and occasionally presented Housewives' Choice on the BBC's Light Programme.

Desmonde continued to appear on the London stage in Where's Charley? (1958), a theatre musical production of the play Charley's Aunt with (Sir) Norman Wisdom, and in the short-lived Belle (1961)
alternatively titled The Ballad of Dr Crippen a music hall musical with George Benson and Rose Hill.

Desmonde was in numerous movies from 1946 to 1965 including several comedies with Norman Wisdom, and starred in several others. The Wisdom films usually involved the gump character (Wisdom) in a junior position to a "straight man" superior, often played by Edward Chapman, and fighting against the unfairness wrought by some "authority figure", often played by Jerry Desmonde.

Personal life 
Desmonde was married to actress Peggy Duncan (born Peggy Doreen Edwards) from 1930 until her death in 1966. They had a daughter named Jacqueline and a son named Gerald. After World War II, the family settled in London and Jacqueline later married musician Peter Howes, who was the son of actor Bobby Howes and brother of actress Sally Ann Howes.

Death 
On 11 February 1967, having experienced bouts of depression following the death of his wife the previous year, Desmonde took his own life via gas poisoning at his home in the St John's Wood area of London; he was 58 years old. He left an estate valued at £1,388 (approximately £32,232 in 2023). He was cremated at Golders Green Crematorium.

Stage credits 
 Belle at the Strand Theatre, London (1961)
 Where's Charley? as Sir Francis Chesney at the Palace Theatre, London (1958)
 The Royal Variety Show (1957)
 The Gay Musical Show at the London Palladium and then the Prince of Wales Theatre with Norman Wisdom (19??)
 Painting the Town a revue with Norman Wisdom at the London Palladium (1955)
 Red-Headed Blonde a farcical comedy at the Vaudeville Theatre, London (1952)
 Out of this World at the London Palladium starring Frankie Howerd (1948)
 Piccadilly Hayride at the Prince of Wales Theatre, London (1946)
 Strike it Again at the Prince of Wales Theatre, London (1944)
 Strike a New Note at the Prince of Wales Theatre, London (1943)
 This Year of Grace on a United States tour then at the Selwyn Theatre, New York (1928) (credited as Jim Sadler).

Filmography 
 The Early Bird (1965), as Mr Walter Hunter, managing director of Consolidated Dairies
 Gonks Go Beat (1965), as Great Galaxian, with Kenneth Connor
 The Beauty Jungle (1964) USA: Contest Girl (1966), as "Rose of England" contest organizer
 Stolen Hours (1963) USA: Summer Flight, as a Colonel
 The Switch (1963), as Customs Chief
 A Stitch in Time (1963), as Sir Hector Hardcastle, with Norman Wisdom
 A Kind of Loving (1962), as a TV Compere
 Carry On Regardless (1961), as Martin Paul
 Follow a Star (1959), as Vernon Carew, with Norman Wisdom
 Just My Luck (1957), as a Goodwood racegoer (uncredited), with Norman Wisdom
 A King in New York (1957), as Prime Minister Voudel, with Charlie Chaplin
 Up in the World (1956), as Major Willoughby, with Norman Wisdom
 Ramsbottom Rides Again (1956), as red Indian Blue Eagle in a comedy western with Arthur Askey
 The Angel Who Pawned Her Harp (1956), as Parker
 Man of the Moment (1955), as foreign office minister Jackson, with Norman Wisdom
 The Malta Story (1953), as a general (uncredited)
 Trouble in Store (1953), as store chief Augustus Freeman, with Norman Wisdom
 Alf's Baby (1953) USA: Her Three Bachelors (1954), as Alf Donkin
 The Perfect Woman (1949), as Raymond a dress shop manager
 Cardboard Cavalier (1949), as Colonel Lovelace, with Sid Field
 London Town (1946) USA: My Heart Goes Crazy (1953), as George a golfing instructor, with Sid Field.

References

External links 

 Biography: The Alan Myers Project, UKGameShows
 Film databases:  and Rotten Tomatoes.

1908 births
1967 deaths
English male musical theatre actors
English male stage actors
Music hall performers
English game show hosts
Actors from Middlesbrough
Male actors from Yorkshire
Suicides in Westminster
English male film actors
English male television actors
20th-century English male actors
20th-century English male singers
20th-century English singers
20th-century English comedians
British male comedy actors
1967 suicides
Suicides by gas